Sara Errani was the defending champion, but she was defeated by World No. 1 Dinara Safina in the final, 6–7(5–7), 6–1, 7–5. This was the final WTA title Safina won before her retirement in 2014.

Seeds

Draw

Finals

Top half

Bottom half

External links
Main Draw
Qualifying Draw

Banka Koper Slovenia Open - Singles
Banka Koper Slovenia Open